Yanybayevo (Yañıbay) is a rural locality (a village) and the administrative centre of Yanybayevsky Selsoviet, Zianchurinsky District, Bashkortostan, Russia. The population was 592 as of 2010. There are 7 streets.

Geography 
Yanybayevo is located 96 km southeast of Isyangulovo (the district's administrative centre) by road. Idelbakovo is the nearest rural locality.

References 

Rural localities in Zianchurinsky District